Guido Notari (10 May 1893 - 21 January 1957) was an Italian actor and radio presenter. He appeared in more than fifty films from 1939 to 1956.

Filmography

References

External links 

1893 births
1957 deaths
Italian male film actors